Anungu schools is a group of ten schools operated by the Government of South Australia which are located in the west of the Australian state of South Australia.

The word anangu means "human being", or "person", and is used by several Aboriginal Australian peoples of the Western Desert cultural bloc to describe themselves.

APY

Amata Anangu School
Amata Anangu School is located in the community of Amata.  In 2018, the school offered Reception to Year 12, and had a total enrolment of 92 students of whom 84% were Indigenous and a teaching staff of 15.

Ernabella Anangu School 
Ernabella Anangu School is located in the community of Pukatja.  In 2018, the school offered Reception to Year 12, and had a total enrolment of 147 students of whom 93% were Indigenous and a teaching staff of 16.

Fregon Anangu School 
Fregon Anangu School is located in the community of Kaltjiti.  In 2018, the school offered Reception to Year 12, and had a total enrolment of 57 students of whom 84% were Indigenous and a teaching staff of eight.

Indulkana Anangu School
Indulkana Anangu School is located in the community of Iwantja.  In 2018, the school offered Reception to Year 12, and had a total enrolment of 89 students of whom 84% were Indigenous and a teaching staff of eight.

Kenmore Park Anangu School
Kenmore Park Anangu School is located in the community of Yunyarinyi.  In 2018, the school offered Reception to Year 12, and had a total enrolment of 10 students of whom 70% were Indigenous and a teaching staff of three.

Mimili Anangu School
Mimili Anangu School is located in the community of Mimili.  In 2018, the school offered Reception to Year 12, and had a total enrolment of 67 students of whom 94% were Indigenous and a teaching staff of 10.

Murputja Anangu School
Murputja Anangu School is located in the community of Murputja.  In 2018, the school offered Reception to Year 12, and had a total enrolment of 26 students who were all Indigenous and a teaching staff of five.

Pipalyatjara Anangu School
Pipalyatjara Anangu School is located in the community of Pipalyatjara.  In 2018, the school  offered Reception to Year 12, and had a total enrolment of 63 students of whom 95% were Indigenous and a teaching staff of nine.

Maralinga Tjarutja

Oak Valley Anangu School
Oak Valley Anangu School is located in the community of Oak Valley.  It was formerly known as the Oak Valley Aboriginal School and was renamed on 19 July 2010 to include the word "anangu".  In 2018, the school  offered Reception to Year 12, and had a total enrolment of seven students who are all Indigenous and a teaching staff of five.

Yalata

Yalata Anangu School
Yalata Anangu School is located in the community of Yalata. The school, which was previously known as the Yalata Aboriginal School, was opened in 1962. In 2018, the school  offered Reception to Year 12, and had a total enrolment of 80 students who were all Indigenous and a teaching staff of ten.

See also
 List of Aboriginal schools in South Australia
 List of schools in South Australia

References

External links
Welcome to Amata Aṉangu School
Welcome to Ernabella Anangu School
 About Fregon (Anangu School)
Welcome to Indulkana Anangu School
Welcome to Kenmore Park Anangu School
Welcome to Mimili Anangu School
Murputja Anangu School
About us (Pipalyatjara Anangu School)
About Oak Valley (Anangu School)
 About Us (Yalata Anangu School)

Public schools in South Australia
High schools in South Australia
Aboriginal schools in South Australia
Far North (South Australia)